John Andrew Crump MB ChB, MD, DTM&H, FRACP, FRCPA, FRCP is a New Zealand-born infectious diseases physician, medical microbiologist, and epidemiologist. He is Professor of Medicine, Pathology, and Global Health at the University of Otago and an Adjunct Professor of Medicine, Pathology, and Global Health at Duke University. He served as inaugural Co-Director of the Otago Global Health Institute, one of the university's research centres. His primary research interest is fever in the tropics, focusing on invasive bacterial diseases and bacterial zoonoses.

Early life and education 
Crump was born in Oamaru and raised on a farm at Okaramio, attending Havelock School and Marlborough Boys’ College. He graduated MB ChB in 1993 and received his MD in 2013 for research on clinical and laboratory aspects of HIV in Tanzania from the University of Otago Medical School. Crump trained as both an internist in infectious diseases and as a pathologist in medical microbiology in New Zealand, England, Australia and the USA, and as an Epidemic Intelligence Service Officer with the US Centers for Disease Control and Prevention (CDC).

Career and research 
Crump studies the diagnosis, management, and prevention of infectious causes of fever in the tropics other than malaria. He has advocated for a comprehensive approach to investigating febrile illness as a necessary progression from the traditional disease-specific approach in tropical medicine. He has contributed to describing the problem of malaria over-diagnosis, and also to appreciation of range of neglected causes of fever including invasive bacterial diseases, as well as bacterial zoonoses such as leptospirosis and Q fever. Much of his research is trans-disciplinary involving close collaboration between human health experts, veterinarians, ecologists, and social scientists, and following the so-called 'One Health' approach. He has led work characterizing the burden of typhoid fever, paratyphoid fever, and invasive nontyphoidal Salmonella disease that has contributed to diagnosis, management, and prevention efforts for these diseases, including vaccine deployment and vaccine development. He served as expert advisor on invasive Salmonella disease to the World Health Organization Foodborne Diseases Epidemiology Reference Group, and as a member of the WHO Strategic Advisory Group of Experts on Immunization Working Group on Typhoid Vaccines.

Crump has a research interest in ethics in global health training, spurred by concern for the unintended consequences of expansion of short-term global health training opportunities in low-resource areas. With Dr. Jeremy Sugarman, Crump co-chaired the Wellcome Trust-funded Working Group on Ethics Guidelines for Global Health Training (WEIGHT) that developed initial guidelines for responsible global health training programs.

Awards and honors 
Crump was awarded the 2005 CDC James H. Steele Veterinary Public Health Award for outstanding contributions by a current officer or alumnus. In 2012, Crump received the American Society of Tropical Medicine and Hygiene Bailey K. Ashford Medal for distinguished work in tropical medicine. Crump was awarded the 2021 University of Otago Dunedin School of Medicine Dean's Medal for Research Excellence. In 2022, Crump was awarded the Royal Society of Tropical Medicine and Hygiene Chalmers Medal for research of outstanding merit in tropical medicine and mentoring of junior investigators.

Publications 
As of September 2021, Crump had published 259 scientific manuscripts, cited >40,000 times.
He is a 2020 cross-field Clarivate Highly Cited Researcher, defined as having multiple papers ranked in the top 1% by citations for field and year.

References

External links 
 
 John Crump publications indexed by PubMed.

University of Otago alumni
Academic staff of the University of Otago
Duke University School of Medicine faculty
Centers for Disease Control and Prevention people
New Zealand infectious disease physicians
New Zealand microbiologists
New Zealand epidemiologists
Year of birth missing (living people)
Living people
Alumni of the London School of Hygiene & Tropical Medicine